The information regarding List of rivers in the Maule Region on this page has been compiled from the data supplied by GeoNames. It includes all features named "Rio", "Canal", "Arroyo", "Estero" and those Feature Code is associated with a stream of water. This list contains 256 water streams.

Content
This list contains:
 Name of the stream, in Spanish Language
 Coordinates are latitude and longitude of the feature in ± decimal degrees, at the mouth of the stream
 Link to a map including the Geonameid (a number which uniquely identifies a Geoname feature)
 Feature Code explained in 
 Other names for the same feature, if any
 Basin countries additional to Chile, if any

List

 Rio MataquitoRío Mataquito3880346STM(Rio Mataquito, Río Mataquito)
  Rio TenoRío Teno3869976STM
  Rio ClaroRío Claro (Teno)3894569STM
  Rio MaloRío Malo (Teno)3880821STM
  Rio NacimientoRío Nacimiento (Teno)3879117STM
  Rio LontueRío Lontué3882528STM
  Rio ColoradoRío Colorado (Lontué)3894030STM
  Rio Palos de San PedroRío Palos de San Pedro3877531STM(Rio Palos de San Pedro, Rio Patos de San Pedro, Río Palos de San Pedro, Río Patos de San Pedro)
 Rio HuenchullamiRío Huenchullami3887659STM(Estero Huenchullami, Rio Huenchullami, Río Huenchullami)
 Rio BarrosoRío Barroso3898640STM
 Estero Cabrera3897569STM
 Rio MauleRío Maule3880305STM
  Rio ClaroRío Claro (Maule)3894568STM
  Rio LircayRío Lircay3883101STM(Rio Lircai, Rio Lircay, Río Lircai, Río Lircay)
  Rio LoncomillaRío Loncomilla3882578STM(Rio Loncomilla, Rio Lonconilla, Río Loncomilla, Río Lonconilla)
  Rio PutaganRío Putagán3874566STM
  Rio AchibuenoRío Achibueno3900690STM(Rio Achibueno, Rio Archibueno, Río Achibueno, Río Archibueno)
  Rio AncoaRío Ancoa3899712STM
  Rio LongaviRío Longaví3882556STM
 Rio PerquilauquenRío Perquilauquén3876475STM
 Rio PurapelRío Purapel3874616STM
  Rio CauquenesRío Cauquenes3896101STM
  Rio TutuvenRío Tutuvén3868854STM
  Rio MeladoRío Melado3880124STM
 Rio BarrosoRío Barroso3898641STM
 Rio NegroRío Negro3878785STM
 Estero San Francisco3872216STM
 Estero Botacura3898007STM(Arroyo Botacura, Estero Botacura)
 Estero Huedque3887727STM
 Rio San JuanRío San Juan3872010STM
 Estero Vega Honda3868542STM
 Rio NiquenRío Ñiquén3878606STM

  Estero Pidihuinco3876169STM
  Estero del Cardonal3896698STM
  Estero VichuquenEstero Vichuquén3868338STM
  Estero HuineEstero Huiñe3887500STM
  Estero LipimavidaEstero Lipimávida3883115STM
  Estero Tilicura3869841STM
  Estero PataconEstero Patacón3877038STM
  Estero Comalle3893967STM
  Estero Boquil3898049STM
  Estero Pichibudi3876306STM
  Estero Las Cardillas3884518STM(Estero Las Cardillas, Estero Los Cardillos, Estero las Cardillas)
  Estero Uraco3868779STM
  Estero Quilico3874214STM
  Estero de Concaven3893896STM
  Estero Duao3892179STM
  Rio SecoRío Seco3871053STM
  Estero El ParronEstero El Parrón3890810STM(Estero El Parron, Estero El Parrón, Estero Parron, Estero Parrón)
  Estero de Los Altos de Caune3882445STM(Estero de Los Altos de Caune, Estero de los Altos de Caune)
  Estero El Buitre3891810STM
  Estero El Guapi3891292STM
  Estero Iloca3887338STM
  Estero Tilicura3869840STM
  Estero El Buche3891825STM
  Estero Rancura3873754STM
  Estero El PenonEstero El Peñón3890761STM
  Estero La Pellana3885049STM
  Estero Guaiquillo3888585STM
  Estero de los Pejerreyes3876850STM(Arroyo de los Pejerreyes, Estero de los Pejerreyes)
  Estero Chequenlemillo3895239STM
  Estero Potrero Grande3875272STM
  Estero Coquimbo3893626STM
  Estero LimavidaEstero Limávida3883195STM
  Estero Los Cuervos3882102STM
  Estero Molino3879604STM
  Rio InfiernilloRío Infiernillo3887200STM
  Rio MaitenesRío Maitenes3880922STM(Rio Los Maitenes, Rio Maitenes, Río Los Maitenes, Río Maitenes)
  Estero LidicoEstero Lídico3883254STM
  Estero Hullinlebu3887461STM
  Estero HuelonEstero Huelón3887698STM
  Estero Las MaquinasEstero Las Máquinas3884205STM
  Estero Laguna3885788STM
  Estero OnolcoEstero Oñolco3878060STM
  Rio CaonaRío Caona3896859STM
  Rio SecoRío Seco3871052STM
  Estero Rapilermo3873708STM
  Estero El Durazno3891450STM
  Estero Culenar3893061STM
  Estero CarretonEstero Carretón3896521STM
  Estero Curipel3892844STM
  Estero Conca3893899STM
  Rio VergaraRío Vergara3868386STM
  Estero PoblacionEstero Población3875599STM
  Rio CajonesRío Cajones3897381STM
  Rio ZorrasRío Zorras3867480STM
  Estero PuduEstero Pudú3875055STM
  Rio HospitalesRío Hospitales3887816STM
  Estero Potrero Grande3875271STM
  Estero Upeo3868786STM
  Estero Junquillar3886696STM
  Estero Quillayes3874148STM(Estero Quillayes, Quebrada Los Quillayes)
  Estero Loma Blanca3882632STM
  Estero Villa Hueso3868178STM
  Estero Los QuenesEstero Los Queñes3881480STM
  Estero Tabunco3870364STM
  Estero Gualleco3888534STM(Estero Gualleco, Estero Las Tizas)
  Estero Coyanco3893325STM(Estero Coyanco, Quebrada Coyanco)(CL)
  Estero de PutuEstero de Putú3874541STM
  Estero CoipueEstero Coipué3894352STM
  Estero de Chagres3895686STM
  Estero Las Palmas3884081STM
  Estero Batuco3898592STM
  Estero Botalcura3898004STM
  Estero La Puente3884901STM
  Estero Colorado3894053STM
  Estero CaneteEstero Cañete3896922STM
  Estero El Guindo3891280STM
  Estero Campusano3897056STM
  Estero Las AguilasEstero Las Águilas3884665STM
  Estero La Verde3883550STM
  Estero La Obra3885205STM
  Estero del Meadero3880255STM
  Estero Las Pataguas3884055STM
  Estero Tutucura3868858STM
  Estero de GuenonEstero de Guenón3888291STM
  Estero El Manzano3891076STM
  Rio San PedroRío San Pedro3871792STM
  Estero La Puente3884900STM(Estero La Puente, Estero La Puerta)
  Estero Quivolgo3873894STM
  Estero La Capilla3886332STM
  Estero El Culenar3891524STM
  Estero Los Robles3881396STM
  Estero Pelarco3876799STM
  Estero Las Chilcas3884473STM(Estero Chilcas, Estero Las Chilcas)
  Rio NevadoRío Nevado3878710STM
  Estero El Pangue3890832STM
  Estero Tricahue3869120STM
  Estero Pelarco3876798STM
  Estero Calabozo3897365STM
  Estero Las Vegas3883789STM
  Estero Las Palmas3884080STM
  Estero Picazo3876326STM
  Estero CaivanEstero Caiván3897399STM
  Estero Tanguao3870166STM
  Rio Las VegasRío Las Vegas3883787STM
  Estero San JoseEstero San José3872093STM
  Arroyo del Descabezado3892629STM
  Estero Los Puercos3881490STM
  Estero VolcanEstero Volcán3867971STM
  Estero Los Robles3881395STM
  Estero Tabon TinajaEstero Tabón Tinaja3870368STM
  Estero Nirivilo3878598STM
  Rio PinotalcaRío Pinotalca3875898STM(Rio Empedrado, Rio Pinotalca, Río Empedrado, Río Pinotalca)
  Rio PerquinRío Perquin3876472STM
  Rio LoancoRío Loanco3882807STM(Rio Loanco, Rio Luanco, Río Loanco, Río Luanco)(CL)
  Rio EmpedradoRío Empedrado3890118STM
  Estero Meneses3880053STM
  Estero Las Lajas3884256STM
  Estero Empedrado3890119STM
  Estero Batuco3898591STM
  Rio RelocaRío Reloca3873507STM
  Rio RariRío Rari3873691STM
  Estero Venegas3868497STM
  Rio MonsalveRío Monsalve3879491STM
  Estero Llamico3883016STM
  Arroyo Trincahues3869087STM
  Rio ClaroRío Claro3894567STM(Rio Claro, Rio Olaro, Río Claro)
  Estero Santa Celia3871634STM
  Estero Barroso3898644STM(Arroyo Barros, Estero Barroso)
  Rio de la InvernadaRío de la Invernada3887139STM
  Estero Sauzal3871178STM
  Estero Batuco3898590STM
  Estero Las Mercedes3884176STM
  Estero San Francisco3872215STM
  Estero Las Garzas3884351STM
  Estero Chanco3895488STM
  Estero Caballo Blanco3897641STM
  Estero Coihueco3894403STM
  Estero Rari3873692STM
  Estero de Abranquil3900741STM
  Estero Las Toscas3883850STM
  Estero Los Robles3881394STM
  Estero Machicura3881096STM
  Estero TorrentonEstero Torrentón3869508STM
  Estero Los Apestados3882416STM(Estero Los Apestados, Los Apeslados)
  Estero La Matanza3885367STM(Estero La Matanza, Estero Manzana)
  Estero PelluhueEstero Pelluhué3876745STMI
  Rio Los CipresesRío Los Cipreses3882193STM(Rio Los Cipreces, Rio Los Ciprees, Rio Los Cipreses, Rio de los Cipreses, Río Los Cipreces, Río Los Ciprees, Río Los Cipreses, Río de los Cipreses)
  Estero Dona ToribiaEstero Doña Toribia3892283STM(Estero Dona Toribia, Estero Doña Toribia, Estero Pena Toribia, Estero Peña Toribia)
  Estero Tronquilemo3869041STM
  Estero Cunaco3892984STM
  Rio PuelcheRío Puelche3875037STM
  Rio PuchepoRío Puchepo3969258STM
  Rio CuranipeRío Curanipe3892886STM
  Estero El ParronEstero El Parrón3890809STM(Arroyo Parron, Arroyo Parrón, Estero El Parron, Estero El Parrón, Rio Parron, Río Parrón)
  Estero del Valle3868664STM
  Estero Checuen3895302STM
  Estero Saavedra3872670STM
  Estero La Hora3885648STM
  Estero Quiu-Quenes3873897STM
  Estero Caldo Verde3897307STM
  Estero TorreonEstero Torreón3869506STM
  Estero Huinganes3887495STM
  Estero Belco3898518STM
  Estero Remolinos3873468STM
  Estero Bureo3897713STM
  Estero Llollinco3882847STM
  Rio ChovellenRío Chovellén3894808STM(Estero Chovellen, Rio Chovellen, Río Chovellén)
  Estero Lircay3883102STM
  Estero Arenas3899395STM
  Estero Piguchen3876038STM
  Estero La Sombra3884119STM
  Estero Arenal3899401STM
  Estero del Molino3879597STM(Estero Molinos, Estero del Molino)
  Estero Liguay3883245STM(Estero Liguay, Rio Liguay, Río Liguay)
  Estero Curipeumo3892842STM
  Estero Llepo3882915STM
  Rio del RosalRío del Rosal3872837STM
  Arroyo Bravo3897950STM(Arroyo Bravo, Estero Bravo)
  Rio BlancoRío Blanco3898212STM
  Rio BanosRío Baños3898808STM
  Estero Piguchen3876039STM
  Estero El Toro3890258STM
  Estero Las Garzas3884350STM
  Estero ChamavidaEstero Chamávida3895592STM
  Quebrada NavioQuebrada Navío3878971STM(Estero Navio, Quebrada Navio, Quebrada Navío)
  Estero El Molino3890980STM(Arroyo del Molino, Estero El Molino)
  Estero Matancilla3880362STM
  Rio CoipoRío Coipo3894361STM(Estero Coipo, Rio Coipo, Río Coipo)
  Estero Membrillo3880070STM(Estero Chimbarongo, Estero Membrillo)
  Estero El Pejerrey3890790STM
  Estero Camarico3897178STM(Camarica, Estero Camarico)
  Estero Parral3877144STM
  Estero Coronel3893530STM
  Estero El Pejerrey3890789STM(Estero El Pejerrey, Estero del Pejerrey)
  Estero Chimbarongo3895058STM
  Estero San Pedro3871808STM
  Estero Nevados3878707STM
  Estero Piedras de Amolar3876066STM
  Estero RodriguezEstero Rodríguez3872948STM
  Rio La PuenteRío La Puente3884899STM
  Estero Gloria3888975STM
  Estero Los Guayes3882036STM(Estero Los Guayes, Estero de los Guayes)
  Estero Hoyada Seca3887807STM
  Estero Nieblas3878679STM
  Estero Riecillos3873317STM
  Rio GuaiquiviloRío Guaiquivilo3888583STM(Rio Guaiquillo, Rio Guaiquivilo, Rio Melado Guaiquivilo, Río Guaiquivilo, Río Melado Guaiquivilo)
  Arroyo Calle3897254STM
  Estero Castillo3896237STM
  Estero Potrero Grande3875270STM
  Estero Los Cristales3882115STM(Estero Los Cristales, Estero los Cristales)
  Estero de los Calabozos3897359STM
  Rio RelbunRío Relbún3873519STM
  Estero Huinganes3887494STM
  Estero Larqui3884693STM
  Estero FariasEstero Farías3889580STM(Arroyo Faria, Arroyo Faría, Arroyo de Farias, Estero Farias, Estero Farías)
  Rio BullileoRío Bullileo3897727STM
  Estero Totora3869446STM
  Estero Castillo3896236STM
  Estero Gangas3889138STM(Estero Gangas, Rio de Gangas, Río de Gangas)
  Estero Deslinde3892573STM
  Rio BlancoRío Blanco3898211STM
  Estero Botica3898002STM
  Estero Molinillos3879611STM
  Estero Hondo3887921STM
  Estero Amargo3899832STM
  Estero Paiva3877717STM
  Estero El Toro3890257STM
  Estero Bagres3898999STM(Arroyo Bagres, Estero Bagres)
  Estero ValdesEstero Valdés3868721STM
  Estero Cieneguitas3894648STM
  Estero Los Bagres3882377STM(Estero Los Bagres, Estero los Bagres)
  Estero Ortegas3877975STM(Estero Ortegas, Estero Ortegus, Estero de Ortega)
  Estero Ponce3875464STM
  Rio CisternasRío Cisternas3894593STM(Cajon Cisternas, Cajón Cisternas, Rio Cisternas, Río Cisternas)

See also
 List of lakes in Chile
 List of volcanoes in Chile
 List of islands of Chile
 List of fjords, channels, sounds and straits of Chile
 List of lighthouses in Chile

Notes

References

External links
 Rivers of Chile
 Base de Datos Hidrográfica de Chile
 

Maule